The 2019–20 Hong Kong First Division League was the 6th season of Hong Kong First Division since it became the second-tier football league in Hong Kong in 2014–15. The season began on 7 September 2019 and ended on 16 April 2020 when the Hong Kong Football Association announced the cancellation of all lower division seasons due to the 2020 coronavirus pandemic in Hong Kong.

League leaders Resources Capital applied for promotion to the Hong Kong Premier League at season's end and were accepted on 24 June 2020.

Teams

Changes from last season

From First Division

Promoted to the Hong Kong Premier League
 Happy Valley
 Rangers

Relegated to the Second Division
 Double Flower 
 Mutual

To First Division

Relegated from the Premier League
 Dreams FC
 Hoi King

Promoted from the Second Division
 North District
 Sham Shui Po

Name changes
 Dreams FC renamed as King Fung
 Metro Gallery renamed as Icanfield

League table

Top scorers

References

Hong Kong First Division League seasons
2019–20 in Hong Kong football
Hong Kong